The International Review of Intellectual Property and Competition Law is a peer-reviewed academic journal published by Springer Science+Business Media on behalf of the Max Planck Institute for Innovation and Competition. It was established in 1970 and covers worldwide developments in intellectual property and competition law. In addition, the journal also covers decisions and leading cases from jurisdictions around the world, as well as editorials, opinions, reports, case notes, and book reviews. The editors-in-chief are Reto M. Hilty and Josef Drexl (Max Planck Institute for Innovation and Competition).

Abstracting and indexing
The journal is abstracted and indexed in:
Emerging Sources Citation Index
International Bibliography of Periodical Literature
Scopus

See also
List of intellectual property law journals

References

External links

English-language journals
Intellectual property law journals
International law journals
Publications established in 1970
Springer Science+Business Media academic journals